Cagle's map turtle (Graptemys caglei) is a species of turtle in the family Emydidae. The species is endemic to Texas, where it is native to the Guadalupe, San Antonio, and San Marcos Rivers.

Etymology
The specific name, caglei, is in honor of American herpetologist Dr. Fred Ray Cagle (1915-1968).

Description
Cagle's map turtle has intricate patterns on the carapace and plastron, as well as serrated edges on the posterior of the carapace, as is typical of all map turtles. It is smaller than most map turtles, and very sexually dimorphic, with males reaching only  straight carapace length, while females can exceed  in straight carapace length.

Diet
Adult females of G. cagle feed mainly on molluscs, but males and juveniles feed mainly on aquatic insects.

Reproduction
Like all turtles, G. caglei is oviparous. A sexually mature female may lay up to three clutches of eggs in a year. Clutch size is small, only one to six eggs.

References

Further reading
Conant R (1975). A Field Guide to Reptiles and Amphibians of Eastern and Central North America, Second Edition. Boston: Houghton Mifflin. xviii + 429 pp. + 48 plates.  (hardback),  (paperback). (Graptemys caglei, p. 58 + Figure 9 on p. 56 + Map 21).
Haynes, David; McKown, Ronald R. (1974). "A New Species of Map Turtle (Genus Graptemys) from the Guadalupe River System in Texas". Tulane Studies in Zoology and Botany 18 (4): 143–152. ("Graptemys caglei new species").
Powell R, Conant R, Collins JT (2016). Peterson Field Guide to Reptiles and Amphibians of Eastern and Central North America, Fourth Edition. Boston and New York: Houghton Mifflin Harcourt. xiv + 494 pp. . (Graptemys caglei, p. 202-203, Figure 92 + Figure 82 on p. 178).
Smith HM, Brodie ED Jr (1982). Reptiles of North America: A Guide to Field Identification. New York: Golden Press. 240 pp.  (hardcover),  (paperback). (Graptemys caglei, pp. 50–51).

External links
Tortoise and Freshwater Turtle Specialist Group (1996). Graptemys caglei. 2006 IUCN Red List of Threatened Species. Retrieved 29 July 2007.

Reptiles of the United States
Graptemys
Reptiles described in 1974
Taxonomy articles created by Polbot
Endemic fauna of Texas